Kehar Singh Basnyat or Kehar Singh Basnet was a Nepalese military commander and warhero who laid down his life in the Unification battles of Nepal. He was born in the illustrious clan of Shreepali Basnyats as a member of Kshettriya (warrior) class.

Family

He was born as second son of General Senapati Badabir Shivaram Singh Basnyat. He had three brothers: Naahar Singh Basnyat, Abhiman Singh Basnyat, and Dhokal Singh Basnyat. He had three sons: Kirtiman Singh Basnyat, Bakhtawar Singh Basnyat, and Jahar Singh Basnyat. King Prithvi Narayan Shah formed an alliance with Basnyat family and Pande family of Gorkha in his quest for the unification of Nepal. As per his Divya Upadesh, King Prithvi Narayan is known to have arranged the marriage between Kaji Kehar Singh and Chitra Devi, the daughter of Kaji of Gorkha Kalu Pande. His father Shivaram Singh was addressed as Senapati Badabir (Brave Chief of the Army) in all the documents of that era. He died in the defensive battle of Sanga Chowk during Unification of Nepal on 1803 B.S.

Career
He actively took part in Unification battles of Nepal. He, along with Kaji Vamsharaj Pande, Mahoddam Kirti Shah, Surpratap Shah, Dal Mardan Shah, Rana Rudra Shah, Nandu Shah, Kaji Naahar Singh Basnyat and Kaji Abhiman Singh Basnyat, was dispatched with approximately 1,100 fighting troops to encircle the Makawanpur fortress by the dawn of 20 August 1762. After consolidation of Kathmandu valley states, King Prithvi Narayan Shah waged war against western Chaubise (24) Confederacy on 1770 A.D., under military leadership of Kaji Bamsharaj Pande, Kaji Kehar Singh Basnyat, and Sardar Prabhu Malla, to initial success. In 1771 A.D., the Gorkhali forces lost the war against 24 Chaubise principalities and Kaji Bamsharaj was captured by soldiers of Parbat Kingdom as a war prisoner. Kaji Kehar Singh died in the battlefield at Satahun. His brother Dhaukal Singh Basnyat and another military officer Sriharsh Pantha narrowly escaped after the tough confrontation at Dhor.

References

Books

Year of birth missing
Year of death missing
Nepalese military personnel
Basnyat family
Nepalese generals
People of the Nepalese unification
Nepalese military personnel killed in action
18th-century Nepalese people